Bachor is a surname. Notable people with the surname include:

Hans A. Bachor (born 1952), Australian research scientist
Isabell Bachor (born 1983), German footballer
Jim Bachor, mosaic artist
Rip Bachor (1901–1959), American football player
Willy Bachor (1921–2008), Wehrmacht Oberwachtmeister